Vincent Jamal Staples (born July 2, 1993) is an American rapper, singer, and actor. Staples was once a close associate of Odd Future, Mike G and Earl Sweatshirt in particular. He is currently signed to Motown and Blacksmith Records.

Staples rose to prominence with appearances on albums by Odd Future members and his collaborative mixtape titled Stolen Youth with producer Mac Miller. In October 2014, he released his debut EP Hell Can Wait, which included the singles "Hands Up" and "Blue Suede". His debut album, Summertime '06, was released in June 2015 to critical acclaim. He was also featured as a part of the XXL 2015 Freshman Class. His second album Big Fish Theory, which contains the singles "BagBak", "Big Fish" and "Rain Come Down", incorporates avant-garde, dance and electronic influences. It was released in June 2017 to further acclaim from critics. In November 2018, Staples released his third studio album, FM! In July 2021, he released his self-titled fourth studio album, and Ramona Park Broke My Heart in April 2022.

Early life and education 
Staples was born in Compton, California, but grew up in North Long Beach, after his mother decided she wanted to move away from Compton due to the high crime rates. Staples is the youngest of five siblings, two brothers and three sisters. Staples grew up in poverty.

Staples attended Optimal Christian Academy from 4th to 8th grade, which he said was an influential and positive experience. During high school, Staples's mom sent him to Atlanta to stay with one of his sisters. He attended high school there for six months. After returning to Southern California, Staples attended other high schools: Jordan High School in Long Beach,  Mayfair High School in Lakewood, Opportunity High School home schooling, Esperanza High School in Anaheim, and Kennedy High School, among others.

Staples has been upfront regarding his involvement with street gangs during his childhood, and is involved with speaking to the youth in his community about the dangers of the gang lifestyle.

Growing up, Staples participated in sports when given the opportunity. Most notably, he played in Snoop Dogg's Snoop Youth Football League (SYFL). When interviewed by Sean Evans on the YouTube show Hot Ones, Staples recalled playing against the Carson Colts and Mission Viejo Cowboys who he claimed had "grown-ass men on the field." Staples then went on to state, "Snoop really did it big, we got our names on our jerseys, we had the best cleats, the best helmets, you know Snoop Dogg really loved football."

Personal life 
Staples has stated that he has never drank alcohol or used illicit drugs, and that he follows a straight edge lifestyle. He is of African-American and Haitian descent and lives in Southern California.

Staples is a fan of the Los Angeles Clippers. He is also an avid fan of modern art and has referenced the feminist French-American sculptor Louise Bourgeois in his song "Rain Come Down" and stated his appreciation for painter and photographer Richard Prince.

Career

2009–2013: Beginnings and Stolen Youth
Staples was discovered by Dijon "LaVish" Samo and Chuck Wun, alongside his cousin Campbell Emerson. LaVish took Staples on a trip to Los Angeles, where he befriended the Odd Future collective's  members Syd tha Kyd, Mike G, and Earl Sweatshirt. Although he had not intended to become a rapper, he made some guest appearances on their songs, most notably "epaR" from Earl Sweatshirt's March 2010 mixtape Earl. After featuring on some other tracks, he decided to pursue a career in rap. He released his official debut mixtape, called Shyne Coldchain Vol. 1 on December 30, 2011, via applebird.com. In October 2012, he released a collaborative mixtape with Michael Uzowuru, titled Winter in Prague. It was produced entirely by Uzowuru.

In 2012, Earl Sweatshirt returned from Samoa and reconnected with Vince. Earl then introduced him to fellow American rapper Mac Miller. In June 2013, Miller (under the alias Larry Fisherman) and Staples released a mixtape titled Stolen Youth. The mixtape features guest appearances from Miller, Ab-Soul, Schoolboy Q, Da$H, Hardo, and Staples's Cutthroat Boyz co-member, Joey Fatts. Following Stolen Youths release, he toured as a supporting act on Miller's Space Migration Tour. After making three appearances on Earl's debut studio album Doris, including the single "Hive", the liner notes revealed Staples had recently signed to the hip hop record label Def Jam Recordings.

2014–2015: Shyne Coldchain Vol. 2, Hell Can Wait, and Summertime '06

On March 13, 2014, he released his fourth mixtape, called Shyne Coldchain Vol. 2. The mixtape features the production from Earl Sweatshirt, Michael Uzowuru, Childish Major, No ID, Evidence, DJ Babu, and Scoop DeVille; as well as guest appearances from singer-songwriters Jhené Aiko and James Fauntleroy. On March 2, 2014, Staples began touring in the United States with a fellow American rappers Schoolboy Q and Isaiah Rashad on the Oxymoron World Tour, to support the release of Schoolboy Q's album Oxymoron.

On August 15, 2014, Staples released a music video for "Blue Suede". The track was also made available on iTunes. On September 9, 2014, Vince released another new song titled "Hands Up" via iTunes. He released the EP Hell Can Wait on October 7, 2014. Prior to the EP's release Staples revealed during an interview with XXL Magazine that it would include guest appearances from A$ton Matthews and Teyana Taylor, along with productions from No I.D., Infamous, and Hagler.

On May 4, 2015, Staples released the first single from his debut album, called "Señorita". He later announced it that his debut studio album would be titled Summertime '06., In June 2015, Staples was named as one of the ten rappers of XXL'''s "2015 Freshman Class", and was featured on the cover alongside fellow up-and-coming rappers Dej Loaf, Fetty Wap, GoldLink, K Camp, OG Maco, Raury, Shy Glizzy, Tink, and Kidd Kidd. On June 15, Staples released the second single from his debut album, "Get Paid" featuring Desi Mo. On June 22, he released the album's third and final single, "Norf Norf". The track reached viral prominence after a video of a mom tearfully complaining about the song became popular on social media. The album was released on June 30, 2015. It received widespread acclaim and debuted at number 39 on the US Billboard 200.

 2016–2017: Prima Donna and Big Fish Theory 

On February 23, 2016, Staples was announced as part of the line up for the 2016 Osheaga Music Festival. On August 25, 2016, Staples released his second EP, the seven-track Prima Donna, which was accompanied by a short film. On February 3, 2017, Staples released "BagBak", the first single from his next studio album. A remix of the song was later featured in the trailer for the Marvel Studios film Black Panther. On March 23, 2017, he was featured on the Gorillaz track "Ascension" from their album Humanz. In an interview on Zane Lowe's show Beats 1, he announced his upcoming album would be called Big Fish Theory and released an accompanying single, "Big Fish", which was followed by the album's third single, "Rain Come Down" on June 8, 2017, featuring Ty Dolla Sign. The album was released on June 23 and received with widespread critical acclaim.

He and rapper Tyler, the Creator announced on November 15 that they would be doing a tour around North America from January 26 to March 4, 2018. Staples then collaborated with film composer Hans Zimmer on a remix of the UEFA Champions League Anthem for the FIFA 19 reveal trailer. On December 15, Staples and celebrated singer and song-writer Billie Eilish released the single "&Burn", which would later appear on the reissue of Eilish's EP Don't Smile at Me later that month. The song was certified gold in the United States by the Recording Industry Association of America (RIAA) on April 2, 2020.

2018–present: FM!, The Vince Staples Show, self-titled album and Ramona Park Broke My Heart

In 2018, Staples set up a GoFundMe page titled "Get the Fuck Off My Dick" seeking $2 million as a response to people criticizing his work; they could pay to have him retire early. However, it was briefly taken down given the low response. The money made from the page was subsequently donated to the Michelle Obama Neighborhood Library in Long Beach. On October 2, Staples released his third studio album FM!. Produced primarily by Kenny Beats, the album is framed as a radio station takeover, featuring recurring skits hosted by Los Angeles radio host Big Boy. In December 2018, Staples contributed the track "Home" to the Spider-Man: Into the Spider-Verse soundtrack, which was originally previewed in the movie's trailer in December 2017.

In 2019, he released three singles: "So What?", "Sheet Music" and "Ad 01: Hell Bound", with the first two singles released alongside episodes from his YouTube Show The Vince Staples Show.

In April 2021, Staples said he was scheduled to release an album in mid-2021, titled Vince Staples. It was eventually released on July 9, to critical acclaim. Staples was also developing a Netflix show. Staples released an album titled Ramona Park Broke My Heart on Motown Records on April 8, 2022 to further acclaim.

Other ventures
Corporate sponsorship
Since 2015, Staples has appeared in advertising campaigns for Sprite and promoted the brand through his Twitter feed.

Philanthropy
On June 14, 2016, Staples announced his assistance in a YMCA program that will benefit young people in North Long Beach. The Youth Institute would teach graphic design, 3D printing, product design, music production and film making to 20 eighth and ninth graders at Hamilton Middle School. Staples donated an undisclosed amount to the program.

Discography

 Summertime '06 (2015)
 Big Fish Theory (2017)
 FM! (2018)
 Vince Staples (2021)
 Ramona Park Broke My Heart (2022)

Concert tours
HeadliningHell Can Wait'' Tour (2014)
Circa '06 Tour (2015–16)
The Life Aquatic Tour (2016–17)
Smile, You're On Camera (2019)

Supporting
Mac Miller - Space Migration Tour (2013)
Joey Bada$$ - B4.DA.$$ Tour (2014)
A$AP Rocky & Tyler, the Creator - Rocky and Tyler Tour (2015)
Gorillaz - Humanz Tour (2017)
Tyler, the Creator - Flower Boy Tour (2018)
Childish Gambino - This Is America Tour (2018)
Tyler, the Creator - Call Me If You Get Lost Tour (2022)

Filmography

Awards and nominations

References

External links

 
 Vince Staples by Simone White—BOMB Magazine

1993 births
Living people
21st-century American male musicians
21st-century American rappers
African-American male rappers
Alternative hip hop musicians
American rappers of Haitian descent
Crips
Gangsta rappers
Musicians from Long Beach, California
Rappers from Los Angeles
West Coast hip hop musicians
21st-century African-American musicians